This is a list of players who have played first-class cricket for Mashonaland, a Zimbabwean cricket team. Mashonaland are currently defunct after the first re-organisation of Zimbabwean domestic cricket for the 2006–06 season.

List of players
Key
 played international cricket
* captained the team in at least one match
† played as wicket-keeper for at least one match

Notes

Captains

Notes

References

Mashonaland first-class